is a former Japanese football player.

Club career
Sakai was born in Mie Prefecture on October 19, 1976. After graduating from high school, he joined Bellmare Hiratsuka in 1995. He debuted and played many matches in 1997. The club released many players due to their financial problems end of 1998 season. In early 1999, he played many matches in the club with many young players. However his opportunity to play decreased in late 1999. The club also finished at bottom place and was relegated to J2 League. In 2000, he moved to J2 club Oita Trinita. However he could hardly play in the match and he retired end of 2000 season.

National team career
In August 1993, Sakai was selected Japan U-17 national team for 1993 U-17 World Championship and he played 2 matches.

Club statistics

References

External links

1976 births
Living people
Association football people from Mie Prefecture
Japanese footballers
Japan youth international footballers
J1 League players
J2 League players
Shonan Bellmare players
Oita Trinita players
Association football forwards